Hans de Jong (26 March 1932 – 3 March 2011) was a Dutch sculptor, designer and ceramist.

Life and work 
Born in Leiden, De Jong received his first lessons in pottery in the studio of Gerrit de Blanken (1894–1961) in Zoeterwoude in 1948. He attended the Gerrit Rietveld Academie, where he studied at the ceramics department under Willem H. de Vries (1908-1969).

In the year 1958-59 De Jong was designer at Intercodam Tegels, which produced glass mosaics and tile panels. In 1959 he started his own studio in Amsterdam. In 1962 De Jong took part of an exhibition of six young ceramists from Amsterdam in Museum Boijmans Van Beuningen, together with Sonja Landweer, Jan de Rooden, Johan van Loon, Jan van der Vaart and Johnny Rolf, which signified the rebirth of artisan ceramics in the Netherlands.

In the 1960s and 1970s he designed several larger ceramic wall sculptures, among others for swimming pools in Utrecht.

See also 
 List of Dutch ceramists

References

Further reading 
 J.W.N. van Achterbergh, "Over Hans de Jong, of de veelsoortige metamorphosen der ceramische ironie," Mededelingenblad Vrienden van de Nederlandse Ceramiek nr. 35, 1964, p. 3-33
 Kuyken-Schneider, De zes amsterdamse pottenbakkers opnieuw bijeen : the six amsterdam potters together again. Dorris U. Uitgever Oosterbeek : Stichting Amphora, 2000.

External links 
  Jong, Hans de at capriolus.nl

1932 births
2011 deaths
Dutch ceramists
Dutch sculptors
Dutch male sculptors
Artists from Leiden